Satish Dhawan Space Centre - SDSC (formerly Sriharikota Range - SHAR) is a rocket launch centre (spaceport) operated by Indian Space Research Organisation (ISRO). It is located in Sriharikota, Tirupati district of Andhra Pradesh. Sriharikota Range was renamed in 2002 after ISRO's former chairman Satish Dhawan.

History 
Sriharikota island was chosen in 1969 for a satellite launching station. The centre became operational in 1971 when an RH-125 sounding rocket was launched. The first attempted launch of an orbital satellite, Rohini 1A aboard a Satellite Launch Vehicle, took place on 10 August 1979, but due to a failure in thrust vectoring of the rocket's second stage, the satellite's orbit decayed on 19 August 1979. SHAR was named as 'Satish Dhawan Space Centre SHAR' (SDSC), on 5 September 2002, in memory of Satish Dhawan, former chairman of the ISRO.

The SHAR facility now consists of two launch pads, with the second built in 2005. The second launch pad was used for launches beginning in 2005 and is a universal launch pad, accommodating all of the launch vehicles used by ISRO. The two launch pads will allow multiple launches in a single year, which was not possible earlier. India's lunar orbiter Chandrayaan-1 launched from the centre at 6:22 AM IST on 22 October 2008. India's first Mars orbiter Mangalyaan was launched from the centre on 5 November 2013, which was successfully placed into Mars orbit on 24 September 2014.

Initially under Indian Human Spaceflight Programme existing launch facilities will be augmented to meet the target of launching a crewed spacecraft called Gaganyaan.

SDSC's current director is Arumugam Rajarajan. He took over from S. Pandian in July 2019.

Location
Satish Dhawan Space Centre (SHAR) is located in Sriharikota, a spindle-shaped barrier island on the east coast of Andhra Pradesh. Features like a good launch azimuth corridor for various missions, nearness to the equator (benefiting eastward launches), and large uninhabited area for a safety zone make it an ideal spaceport.

Prior to its acquisition for ISRO by the Government of India, it was a firewood plantation of Eucalyptus and Casuarina trees. This island is affected by both south-westerly and north-easterly monsoons, but heavy rains come only in October and November. Thus many clear days are available for out-door static tests and launchings.

SHAR is linked to Sullurupeta by a road across Pulicat Lake.

Launch history

Originally known as the Sriharikota Range (SHAR) and later named after Satish Dhawan. It is India's primary orbital launch site to this day. First flight-test of 'Rohini-125', a small sounding rocket which took place on 9 October 1971 was the first rocket launch from SHAR. Since then technical, logistic and administrative infrastructure have been enhanced. Together with the northerly Balasore Rocket Launching Station, the facilities are operated under the ISRO Range Complex (IREX) headquartered at SHAR.

Satellite Launch Vehicle (SLV)
The range became operational when three Rohini 125 sounding rockets were launched on 9 and 10 October 1971. Previously, India used Thumba Equatorial Rocket Launching Station (TERLS), at Thiruvananthapuram, on the south-western coast of India, to launch sounding rockets. The first test launch of the complete SLV-3 rocket occurred in August 1979 but it was only partially successful following a malfunction in the second-stage guidance system. SHAR facilities worked satisfactorily during the SLV-3 preparation and launch. On 18 July 1980 the SLV-3 successfully launched India's third satellite. Out of the four SLV launches from SHAR, two were successful.

Augmented Satellite Launch Vehicle (ASLV)
The ASLV orbital launcher was integrated vertically, beginning with motor and subassembly preparations in the Vehicle Integration Building (VIB) and completed on the pad within the 40 m tall Mobile Service Structure. The first ASLV launch from SHAR took place in 1987 and resulted in a failure. Eventually, out the four ASLV launches from 1987 to 1994, only one was successful.

Polar Satellite Launch Vehicle (PSLV)
The Polar Satellite Launch Vehicle launch complex was commissioned during 1990. It has a 3,450 tonne, 76.5 m high Mobile Service Tower (MST) which provides the SP-3 payload clean room. The solid propellant motors for the PSLV are processed by SHAR, which also carries out launch operations. The first launch of the PSLV took place on 20 September 1993.

Geosynchronous Satellite Launch Vehicle (GSLV)
The first launch of India's Geosynchronous Satellite Launch Vehicle (GSLV) was successfully completed on 18 April 2001. GSLV, with its own cryogenic upper stage, has enabled the launch of communications satellites of the class up to 2 tonnes. The next variant of GSLV is GSLV Mk III with its own cryogenic high-thrust engine and stage capable of launching communications satellites of the 4-ton class.

Facilities
The SDSC has two operational orbital launch pads. SHAR is ISRO's satellite launching base and additionally provides launch facilities for the full range of Rohini sounding rockets. The Vehicle Assembly, Static Test and Evaluation Complex (VAST, previously STEX) and the Solid Propellant Space Booster Plant (SPROB) are located at SHAR for casting and testing solid motors. The site also has a Telemetry, Tracking, Range Instrumentation, & Control centre for Range Operation (RO), Liquid Propellant Storage and Servicing Facilities (LSSF), the Management Service Group and Sriharikota Common Facilities. The PSLV launch complex was commissioned in 1990. It has a 3,450 tonne, 76.5 m high Mobile Service Tower (MST) which provides the SP-3 payload clean room.

The Solid Propellant Space Booster Plant (SPROB) processes large size propellant grains for the satellite launch vehicles. The Vehicle Assembly & Launching Facility (VALF), Solid Motor Preparation & Environmental Testing Facility (SMP&ETF) tests and qualifies different types of solid motor for launch vehicles. The control centre at SHAR houses computers and data processing, closed circuit television, real-time tracking systems and meteorological observation equipment. It is linked to eight radars located at Sriharikota and the five stations of ISRO's Telemetry, Tracking & Command Network (ISTRAC).

The propellant production plant produces composite solid propellant for rocket motors of ISRO using ammonium perchlorate (oxidiser), fine aluminium powder (fuel) and hydroxyl terminated polybutadiene (binder).

Rocket motors and their subsystems have to be rigorously tested and evaluated on ground before they are declared flight worthy. The facilities at SDSC are used for testing solid rocket motors, both at ambient conditions and simulated high altitude conditions. Besides these, there are facilities for conducting vibration, shock, constant acceleration and thermal/humidity tests.

SDSC has infrastructure for launching satellites into low Earth orbit, polar orbit and geo-stationary transfer orbit. The launch complexes provide support for vehicle assembly, fueling, checkout and launch operations. The centre also has facilities for launching sounding rockets for atmospheric studies. The mobile service tower, launch pad, preparation facilities for different launch stages & spacecraft, storage, transfer and servicing facilities for liquid propellants, etc., are the principal parts of the PSLV/GSLV launch complex.

For supporting the GSLV Mark III, additional facilities were set up at SDSC. A new plant (SPP) is set up to process heavier class boosters with 200 tonnes of Solid propellant. The static test complex is being augmented for qualifying the S-200 booster. Other new facilities include a Solid Stage Assembly Building, Satellite Preparation and Filling Facility and Hardware Storage buildings. The existing liquid propellant and cryogenic propellant storage and filling systems, Propellant Servicing Facilities will also be augmented. The range instrumentation system will be enhanced further.

SDSC also has a S band Doppler weather radar that contributes to India Meteorological Department radar network and serves as a stand-in for Doppler weather radar in Chennai.

ISRO opened a viewing gallery at the Satish Dhawan Space Centre in March 2019. The gallery faces the two launchpads and can accommodate 5,000 people giving the general public the opportunity to witness rocket launches. The launch of PSLV-C45 on 1 April 2019 was the first launch that allowed spectators into the gallery.

Launch pads

SLV3 Launch Pad 
The SLV3 Launch Pad began operation in 1979 and was decommissioned in 1994. It was used by two launch vehicles of the ISRO: the Satellite Launch Vehicle (SLV) and the Augmented Satellite Launch Vehicle (ASLV). Initially it was built for launching SLV-3s but was later also used as an ASLV launch complex. The first launch from this pad occurred on 10 August 1979, and was that of the first experimental flight of SLV-3 carrying the Rohini Technology Payload satellite. The last flight was of ASLV on 4 May 1994 carrying SROSS-C2.

First Launch Pad 
The First Launch Pad began operation in 1993. It is currently used to launch the Polar Satellite Launch Vehicle, and formerly used by the Geosynchronous Satellite Launch Vehicle. It is one of two operational orbital launch pads at the site, the other being the Second Launch Pad, which opened in 2005. The first launch from this pad occurred on 20 September 1993, and was the maiden flight of the Polar Satellite Launch Vehicle carrying the IRS-1E satellite. The maiden flight of the Small Satellite Launch Vehicle also occurred from this pad on 7 August 2022.

The First Launch Pad is undergoing major expansion with PIF (PSLV Integration Facilities) project worth  . Once complete, the first launch pad is expected to cater to around 15 launches per year.

Second Launch Pad 
The Second Launch Pad was designed, supplied, erected and commissioned by MECON Limited, a Government of Indian Enterprise, located at Ranchi (Jharkhand, India) during the period March 1999 to December 2003. The second launch pad with associated facilities was built in 2005. However it became operational on 5 May 2005 with the launching of PSLV-C6. MECON's sub-contractors for this project including Inox India, HEC, Tata Growth, Goderej Boyce, Simplex, Nagarjuna Construction, Steelage, etc. The other Launch Pad being the First Launch Pad. It is used by Polar Satellite Launch Vehicles, Geosynchronous Satellite Launch Vehicles, GSLV Mark III and is intended for India's first crewed space mission.

The first launch from the pad occurred on 5 May 2005, and was of a Polar Satellite Launch Vehicle carrying the CARTOSAT-1 and HAMSAT satellites. India's 1st Moon Mission, Chandrayan-I was launched from this launch pad on 22 October 2008. Its follow-up mission Chandrayaan-2 was also launched from this launch pad on 22 July 2019.

In November 2019, ISRO released tenders for augmentation of SLP for Gaganyaan project.

Third Launch Pad 
A Third Launch Pad has been proposed in 2012 with estimated cost to be .

This launch pad is intended to be used for future Indian rockets like the Unified Launch Vehicle and GSLV Mark III as well as the older ones like Polar Satellite Launch Vehicle and Geosynchronous Satellite Launch Vehicle. The launch pad will be used for the India's future human space missions. One of the main reasons of building this launch pad is that it will increase the frequency of orbital launches by ISRO.

In 2018, it was reported that the launch of India's first crewed orbital spacecraft "Gaganyaan" is scheduled to be launch from the third launch pad before 2022. However, in November 2019, ISRO released tenders for augmentation of Second Launch Pad for Gaganyaan project.

See also

References

External links

Satish Dhawan Space Centre Official Website
Chandrayaan-1
Sriharikota on Encyclopedia Astronautica
About Shar centre
Federation of American Scientists: Satish Dhawan Space Centre
SHAR centre layout
Spaceport of India - SHAR center of ISRO

 
Spaceports
Rocket launch sites in India
Rocket launch sites
Space programme of India
1971 establishments in Andhra Pradesh
Indian Space Research Organisation facilities
Buildings and structures in Tirupati district